Turkey competed at the 2004 Summer Olympics in Athens, Greece, from 13 to 29 August 2004. Turkish athletes have competed at every Summer Olympic Games since its debut in 1908. Turkey did not attend the 1920 Summer Olympics in Antwerp, the 1932 Summer Olympics in Los Angeles at the period of Great Depression, and the 1980 Summer Olympics in Moscow because of the United States boycott. The Turkish Olympic Committee (TMOK) sent the nation's largest delegation to the Games. A total of 65 athletes, 45 men and 20 women, competed in 10 sports. There was only a single competitor in shooting and taekwondo.

The Turkish team featured two defending Olympic champions from Sydney: Greco-Roman wrestler Hamza Yerlikaya, and weightlifter and world record holder Halil Mutlu, who competed at his fourth Olympic Games as the most sophisticated athlete of the team. Among the Turkish athletes, three of them were born in the former Soviet Union (two of which were previously played for the Unified Team at the 1992 Summer Olympics in Barcelona), namely archer Natalia Nasaridze, long distance runner Ebru Kavaklıoğlu, and Belarusian-born heptathlete Anzhela Atroshchenko. Finn sailor Ali Enver Adakan, who achieved a top ten finish in Sydney four years earlier, was appointed by the committee to carry the Turkish flag in the opening ceremony.

Turkey left Athens with a total of eleven Olympic medals (three golds, four silver, and four bronze), being considered its most successful Olympics with respect to the overall medal count since 1948. Nearly half of these medals were awarded to the athletes in weightlifting, including a third straight defense for Halil Mutlu in the men's bantamweight class on his final Olympic bid. Meanwhile, Eşref Apak originally claimed the bronze in men's hammer throw. On December 5, 2012, Belarus' Ivan Tsikhan stripped off his silver as being ordered by the International Olympic Committee, after drug re-testings of their samples were found positive, and in case of IOC decision to redistribute medals would upgrade Apak's spot to the silver medal position.

Medalists

|  style="text-align:left; width:72%; vertical-align:top;"|

| style="text-align:left; width:23%; vertical-align:top;"|

* No IOC decision to redistribute medals after Ivan Tsikhan's disqualification in men's hammer throw.

Archery

Four Turkish archers (one man and three women) qualified each for the men's and women's individual archery, and a spot for the women's team.

Athletics

Turkish athletes have so far achieved qualifying standards in the following athletics events (up to a maximum of 3 athletes in each event at the 'A' Standard, and 1 at the 'B' Standard).

Men
Track & road events

Field events

Women
Track & road events

Field events

Combined events – Heptathlon

Boxing

Turkey sent eight boxers to the Olympics in Athens.

Judo

Three Turkish judoka (two men and one woman) qualified for the 2004 Summer Olympics.

Men

Women

Sailing

Turkish sailors have qualified one boat for each of the following events.

Men

Open

M = Medal race; OCS = On course side of the starting line; DSQ = Disqualified; DNF = Did not finish; DNS= Did not start; RDG = Redress given

Shooting 

Turkey has qualified a single shooter.

Men

Swimming

Turkish swimmers earned qualifying standards in the following events (up to a maximum of 2 swimmers in each event at the A-standard time, and 1 at the B-standard time):

Men

Women

Taekwondo

One Turkish taekwondo jin qualified to compete in the men's 80 kg class.

Weightlifting 

Nine Turkish weightlifters qualified for the following events:

Men

Women

Wrestling

Men's freestyle

Men's Greco-Roman

See also
 Turkey at the 2004 Summer Paralympics
 Turkey at the 2005 Mediterranean Games

References

External links
Official Report of the XXVIII Olympiad

Nations at the 2004 Summer Olympics
2004
Summer Olympics